Edward Vaux (2 September 1916 – 6 April 2002) was an English professional footballer who played in the Football League for Mansfield Town as a full back.

Career statistics

References

1916 births
2000 deaths
English footballers
English Football League players
Thorne Colliery F.C. players
Goole Town F.C. players
Mansfield Town F.C. players
Chelsea F.C. players
Peterborough United F.C. players
Association football fullbacks
Glentoran F.C. players
Gainsborough Trinity F.C. players
Hull City A.F.C. wartime guest players
Chelmsford City F.C. wartime guest players